Ruza Wenclawska (December 15, 1889 – 1977), more widely known as Rose Winslow and later as Rose Lyons by marriage, was a Polish-American suffragist, factory inspector and trade union organizer. She was a dedicated member of the National Woman's Party. Wenclawska's main goal within this organization was to advocate fair treatment in the workplace for women. She also worked as an actress and a poet.

Early life
Wenclawska was born in Suwałki, Congress Poland, and immigrated to the United States with her parents when she was an infant. At the age of eleven, she began work as a mill girl in the hosiery industry in Pittsburgh. Her father was a miner and her brother a slate picker. Wenclawska also worked in factories in Philadelphia. When she was nineteen, she caught tuberculosis, and was unable to work for two years. During this time, Wenclawska put herself through night school, and began working as a labor organizer.

Later life
Wenclawska worked as a factory inspector and a trade union organizer in New York City with the National Consumers' League and the National Women's Trade Union League. She also worked with the Woman’s Political Union by 1913 before joining the National Woman's Party. Wenclawska became an excellent public speaker during her years of union activism and would travel across the country speaking to suffrage rallies, often with National Woman's Party founder Alice Paul. However, Wenclawska would advocate for the inclusion of working-class women and men into the National Woman's Party while Paul did not wish to organize men and did not encourage a pro-labor message in her platform. In February 1914, Wenclawska and Doris Stevens spoke at a mass meeting for working women and organized a mass suffrage parade in which working women marched to the White House to meet with Woodrow Wilson on suffrage rights. Also in 1914, Wenclawska and Lucy Burns were leaders of the Congressional Union for Woman Suffrage's campaign in California to urge voters to oppose Democratic congressional candidates. She did similar work with other organizers in Wyoming during the electoral campaigns of 1916. During this time, she also wrote a poem, "The 'New Freedom' for Women," that was published in The Suffragist. There she compared Wilson unfavorably to Abraham Lincoln, who sacrificed his life to give freedom to slaves. Wilson, in contrast, told suffrage advocates, "You can afford to wait."

In 1917, she was part of the Silent Sentinels protests at the White House. On October 15, 1917, Wenclawska was arrested, sentenced to seven months in jail, and was sent to the Occoquan Workhouse in Virginia. Once in jail, Wenclawska and her fellow picketers were threatened, assaulted, and abused. Wenclawska, herself, was placed in solitary confinement for at least five weeks. These abuses resulted in a hunger strike, a symbolic protest that forced the authorities to either release them or torture them by force-feeding. This demonstration also intended to identify the picketers as political rather than criminal prisoners. During this time, Wenclawska smuggled letters out to her husband, Philip Lyons, and her friends. In one of these letters she writes, "I am waiting to see what happens when the President realizes that brutal bullying isn’t quite a statesmanlike method for settling a demand for justice at home...All the officers here know we are making this hunger strike that women fighting for liberty may be considered political prisoners; we have told them. God knows we don’t want other women ever to have to do this over again." Eventually all of the women were released and courts ruled that the arrests had been improper. Following more than two years of White House picketing, Congress approved the 19th Amendment and sent it out to the states for ratification, which followed in August 1920. Her engagement in political activism appears to have ended with her White House picketing and subsequent jail time.

Wenclawska married shortly after she was released from prison, and the 1920 census listed her and her husband Philip Lyons living in Greenwich Village. She listed herself as an actress and performed in several plays in New York City and Provincetown, including a part in Eugene O'Neill's Desire Under the Elms, on Broadway in 1924. She performed under her maiden name, Ruza Wenclawska. Her death date is unclear. Guy Pène du Bois wrote of her as "the late Rose Winslow" in his 1940 memoir, Artists Say the Silliest Things. However, the Library of Congress website, "Women of Protest: Photographs from the Records of the National Woman's Party," indicates that she died in 1977. It is most likely that she died in 1977.

Legacy
Doris Stevens published excerpts of Wenclawska’s smuggled diary scraps from her time spent in the Occoquan Workhouse in Jailed for Freedom (1920), a history of militant suffragists in the United States between 1913 and 1919.

She was portrayed by Vera Farmiga in the 2004 film Iron Jawed Angels.  In this film, however, Wenclawska’s character is utilized as a composite character to represent all working class women that contributed to the women’s suffrage movement, and her role in the suffrage movement is downplayed; in real life, Wenclawska was a major player in the suffrage movement. The film indicates that Wenclawska was inspired to join the suffrage movement after Alice Paul pointed out that a woman with the right to vote is also a woman able to voice her opinions, such as the need for a safer working environment. It is unclear as to when Wenclawska was first introduced to Alice Paul and the National Woman’s Party, but it is known that Wenclawska was a political activist before this introduction and that she would do much greater things than suggested in Iron Jawed Angels.

In 2017 the book Feminist Essays by Nancy Quinn Collins was published; it was dedicated to Wenclawska.

References

External links
 
 Excerpt from Ruza Wenclawska's Occuquan Workhouse diary

1889 births
20th-century American actresses
American people of Polish descent
American stage actresses
American suffragists
Congress Poland emigrants to the United States
1977 deaths
National Woman's Party activists